Nasarawa North Senatorial District covers  three local governments which are Akwanga, Eggon and Wamba. Akwanga is the headquarters (collation centre) of Nasarawa North Senatorial District. The current representative of the district is Godiya Akwashiki of the Social Democratic Party, SDP.

List of senators representing Nasarawa North

References 

Nasarawa State
Senatorial districts in Nigeria